The Battle of Arles was fought between the Visigoths and the Western Roman Empire in 471. Prior to the battle, the Visigoths had defeated the Bretons at the Battle of Déols in 469, and were expanding into Aquitaine. Alarmed with this development, Emperor Anthemius sent an expedition under Anthemiolus across the Alps against the Visigothic king Euric, who was besieging Arles. Euric crushed the Roman army and killed Anthemiolus and three Roman counts. Euric subsequently captured Arles and much of southern Gaul. The defeat in Gaul was a direct cause of the subsequent overthrow of Anthemius as emperor by Ricimer.

Sources
 

471
Arles
Arles
Arles 471
Arles